Vadim Viacheslavovich Ivanov (born 19 January 1994) is a Russian pair skater. With former partner Anastasia Dolidze, he is the 2012 Winter Youth Olympics bronze medalist. In 2013, he began competing with Vlada Mishina.

Programs 
(with Dolidze)

Competitive highlights

With Mishina

With Dolidze

References

External links 
 
 

Russian male pair skaters
1994 births
Living people
Figure skaters from Moscow
Figure skaters at the 2012 Winter Youth Olympics
20th-century Russian people
21st-century Russian people